Frederick or Fred Humphries may refer to:

Frederick S. Humphries (1935–2021), American academic administrator and chemistry professor
Frederick Ward Humphries II (born 1965/66), American FBI agent involved in the Petraeus scandal
Fred Humphries, a character in the 1983 film Kentucky Woman

See also
Frederick Humphreys (disambiguation)